The Last Day is a 1972 Soviet drama film directed by Mikhail Ulyanov. The screen version of the play of the same name by Boris Vasilyev.

Plot
On his last working day, the outgoing district plenipotentiary, junior police lieutenant Semyon Mitrofanovich Kovalyov, as usual, bypasses the site and solves the accumulated problems. Among the usual cases, parsing and talking with drunkards, he finds time for the neighbor girl Alla, who fell under the influence of the leader of the thieves' gang. Seeing her in the company of a young man, similar in description to a certain Valera, suspected of theft, he tries to detain him, but he is killed by a lethal blow.

Cast
 Mikhail Ulyanov as Kovalyov
 Vyacheslav Nevinny as Stepan Danilovich Stepeshko
 Igor Kashintsev as Grisha
 Bohdan Stupka as Valery
 Mikhail Zhigalov as lieutenant 
 Vladimir Nosik as Sergey
 Valentina Vladimirova as mother
 Pyotr Kolbasin as policeman
 Vitali Konyayev as episode (uncredited)

Other screen versions 
In 1972, the director Boris Ravenskikh staged a play by Vasilyev at the  Maly Theatre. In 1973 the performance was recorded for television.

References

External links 

1973 drama films
1973 films
Soviet drama films
Mosfilm films
Films based on works by Boris Vasilyev
Films about police officers
1970s police films
1970s police procedural films

1970s Russian-language films